Maxillaria jenischiana is a species of orchid endemic to Venezuela.

References

External links 

jenischiana
Orchids of Venezuela
Plants described in 1854